Poa kunthii is a species of grass endemic to Ecuador.

References

kunthii
Endemic flora of Ecuador
Data deficient plants
Taxonomy articles created by Polbot